Ernesto Escobedo was the defending champion but lost in the first round to Mats Moraing.

Maximilian Marterer won the title after defeating Bradley Klahn 7–6(7–3), 7–6(8–6) in the final.

Seeds

Draw

Finals

Top half

Bottom half

References
Main Draw
Qualifying Draw

Monterrey Challenger - Singles